Primeuchroeus is a genus of cuckoo wasp found in Australia. The genus contains about 20 species. Like all cuckoo wasps, they are brood parasites.

References 

Chrysidinae
Hymenoptera genera